Xaviernesmea  is a genus of bacteria from the family Rhizobiaceae.

References

Hyphomicrobiales
Bacteria genera